Live at the Village Vanguard: The Art of the Trio Volume Two is a live album by American pianist and composer Brad Mehldau released on the Warner Bros. label in 1998.

Reception

AllMusic awarded the album 4 stars and in its review by Joel Roberts, states "It takes a certain nerve for a young jazz artist to subtitle an album Live at the Village Vanguard. The title evokes some mighty powerful spirits from the jazz pantheon. John Coltrane, Sonny Rollins. Bill Evans. Joe Henderson. But pianist Brad Mehldau is more than up to this daunting challenge... he has made a stunning album of exploratory jazz that holds its own with the great "Live at the Village Vanguard" recordings of the past".

Track listing 
 "It's All Right with Me" (Cole Porter) - 12:39
 "Young and Foolish" (Albert Hague, Arnold B. Horwitt) - 13:07
 "Monk's Dream" (Thelonious Monk) - 11:09
 "The Way You Look Tonight" (Dorothy Fields, Jerome Kern) - 12:33
 "Moon River" (Henry Mancini, Johnny Mercer) - 10:52
 "Countdown" (John Coltrane) - 12:40

Personnel 
Musicians
 Brad Mehldau - Piano
 Larry Grenadier - Bass 
 Jorge Rossy - Drums

Production
 Matt Pierson – producer
 James Farber – engineer
 Greg Calbi – engineer (mastering)
 Dana Watson – production coordination
 Rey International – art direction, design
 Larry Fink – photography

References 

1997 live albums
Brad Mehldau live albums
Albums produced by Matt Pierson
Albums recorded at the Village Vanguard
Warner Records live albums